The Offices, Shops and Railway Premises Act 1963 is an Act of the Parliament of the United Kingdom. At the time of its passage, the Act was intended to extend the protection of workplace health, safety and welfare under the Factories Act 1961 to other employees in Great Britain. Though  some of it remains in force, it has largely been superseded by the Health and Safety at Work etc. Act 1974 and regulations made under it.

Breach of the residual provisions is still a crime punishable on summary conviction in the magistrates' court by a fine of up to £400 or, on indictment in the Crown Court, imprisonment for up to two years and an unlimited fine.

In the event of damage arising from a breach of the Act, there may be civil liability for breach of statutory duty. Though no such liability is stipulated by the Act itself, none is excluded and the facts could be such as to give rise to a cause of action in that tort. A breach not actionable in itself may be evidential towards a claim for common law negligence. In particular, a criminal conviction may be given in evidence.

Background
The Act stemmed from the 1949 Gowers Report which had already led to the Mines and Quarries Act 1954, Agriculture (Safety, Health and Welfare Provisions) Act 1956 and Factories Act 1961. The 1963 Act extended protection to a further 8 million employees.

Scope of Act

Health, safety and welfare of employees (general provisions)
Sections 4 to 16 defined general broad requirements for safe and healthy workplace working conditions:
Cleanliness
Overcrowding
Temperature
Ventilation
Lighting
Sanitary conveniences
Washing facilities
Supply of drinking water
Accommodation for clothing
Sitting facilities
Seating for sedentary work
Eating facilities
Construction and maintenance of floors, stairways and passageways.

These provisions were repealed and superseded, as far as they applied to "workplaces", by the Workplace (Health, Safety and Welfare) Regulations 1992 with effect from 1 January 1993 for new workplaces and 1 January 1996 for established workplaces. There is still a potential residual scope of application to "offices, shops and railway premises" that are not "workplaces" as the definition of "workplace" is in some ways limited.

Section 17 made requirements for the safeguarding of machinery but was repealed and superseded by the Provision and Use of Work Equipment Regulations 1992 between 1 January 1993 and 1 January 1997.

Section 18 prohibited persons under 18 from cleaning certain hazardous machinery but was repealed and superseded by the Health and Safety (Young Persons) Regulations 1997 on 3 March 1997.

Sections 20 to 22 gave the Secretary of State the power to make regulations under the Act but these powers were repealed with the coming into force of the 1974 Act.

Section 23 restricted manual lifting of weights that might cause injury but these requirements were repealed and superseded by the Manual Handling Operations Regulations 1992 on 1 January 1993.

References

Bibliography

 
Lord Mackay of Clashfern (ed.) (2004) Halsbury's Laws of England, 4th ed. reissue, Vol.20, "Health and Safety at Work"
 (Google Books)

United Kingdom Acts of Parliament 1963
Health and safety in the United Kingdom
Safety codes
Occupational safety and health law